Shindell is a surname. Notable people with the surname include:

Drew Shindell, American climatologist
Richard Shindell (born 1960), American singer-songwriter and musician